Kimi Hanauer (born 1993) is an artist, writer, musician, and cultural organizer. She is the founder of Press Press, an interdisciplinary publishing house that focuses on underrepresented voices and narratives. She has worked in Baltimore, Maryland and Los Angeles, California. From 2012–2016, Hanauer was a member of the indie rock band Adventures with current Code Orange band members Reba Meyers, Jami Morgan, Joe Goldman, and Dominic Landolina.

Biography 
Kimi Hanauer was born in Tel Aviv, Israel. She received her Bachelor of Fine Arts degree from the Maryland Institute College of Art in 2015. She is a Master of Fine Arts candidate in interdisciplinary studio at the University of California, Los Angeles. 

In 2013, Hanauer developed Paradise Now, an open-ended game in which participants must follow abstract instructions to earn points. The game was first established Penthouse Gallery in Baltimore, where Hanauer was working. The game was conceptualized as a platform for the participants to express themselves. The title of the game comes from the film Paradise Now, which focused on the lives of two Palestinian suicide bombers through a humanistic lens.

In 2014, Hanauer established Press Press, an interdisciplinary publishing house. Hanauer was inspired to start the publishing house after volunteering as an ESL creative writing teacher at the Refugee Youth Project (RYP) in Baltimore. She  collaborated with other RYP volunteers to launch Press Press. The books are distributed at art book fairs such as the New York Art Book Fair and Los Angeles Art Book Fair.

In 2016, Hanauer published "The Making of: Publics and Liberation," which she edited. The book featured conversations with various artists and activists in Baltimore, including Jenné Afiya (Balti Gurls), Fire Angelou (Daughters of the Diaspora), Emeline Boehringer & Kory Sanders (Beast Grrl Collective), Sarrita Hunn (Temporary Art Review).

References 

1993 births
Living people
People from Tel Aviv
Israeli expatriates in the United States
Maryland Institute College of Art alumni
University of California alumni